Mitchell Branch is a  long 1st order tributary to the Banister River in Pittsylvania County, Virginia.

Course 
Mitchell Branch rises about 1 mile northeast of Callands, Virginia and then flows south and then east to join the Banister River about 0.5 miles southwest of Rondo.

Watershed 
Mitchell Branch drains  of area, receives about 46.2 in/year of precipitation, has a wetness index of 351.00, and is about 44% forested.

See also 
 List of Virginia Rivers

References 

Rivers of Virginia
Rivers of Pittsylvania County, Virginia
Tributaries of the Roanoke River